Gabriel Vincent Malizon (born March 11, 2000), popularly known as Vinci Malizon, is a Filipino idol and member of the Filipino-South Korean boy group, Hori7on, a group that was produced through the survival reality show, Dream Maker. He rose to prominence when he centered the signal song for the show, "Take My Hand". On February 12, 2023, it was announced that he will debut as a member of Hori7on.

Early life and education 
Gabriel Vincent Malizon was born in Santo Tomas, Batangas. He was part of their school's dance group, and is into POP and RnB music. He is a Bachelor of Arts in Multimedia Arts and Design student from an arts and business college, iAcademy.

Career

2022–present: Dream Maker and forthcoming debut in Hori7on 

At the age of 22, Malizon became a contestant on Dream Maker.

On September 5, 2022, MLD Entertainment, KAMP Global and ABS-CBN announced that they would form a Filipino boy group that will debut in South Korea under MLD Entertainment and KAMP Korea through the ongoing idol survival show, Dream Maker premiered on November 19, 2022. On November 16, the profile photos of the 62 contestants, Malizon included, were revealed.

On the premier of the show, Malizon performed a cover of GOT7's Lullaby. He was also the first one to perform and got 688 score and was Ranked 4th in mentors' evaluation. He was also picked to have the center position in the signal song of the show, "Take My Hand" after performing well during rehearsals."This is a level test, Vinci is the only one who understands K-pop. I can entrust him with the overall performance" Bae Wan Hee said. During Mission 1, in their performance of VST & Co.’s “Awitin mo at Isasayaw Ko” Malizon's Team C Vision lost against Hexorphic after the other team received a total of 3,357 points. He received high mentors scores and highest public votes and finished as Rank 2. On Mission 2, Malizon together with other members of Team Ambizion performed "Amazon" by TFN. During the rankings, he remained on Rank 2.

During Mission 3,  Malizon performed "Odd Eye" with Team Eyerisk and snatched the Rank 1 in the fourth rankings of ‘Dream Maker’ which was revealed on January 29, 2023. He got the highest mentor scores with 512 points and the second highest public votes with 1,102 points following Marcus Cabais who rose to the second spot with 1,089 points.

On the show's finale in February 12, 2023 at the Caloocan City Sports Complex, Malizon was revealed to have ranked fourth overall with 2,447,877 public votes, thus making him one of the seven members of Hori7on.  They are now set to debut in South Korea as a global pop group in mid-June of the same year.

Filmography

Television

References

External links 

Living people
2000 births
Filipino singers
People from Batangas